Ben Kimura may refer to:

, Japanese erotic artist
, Japanese politician